The Block (HaBlock) is the Israeli version of the Australian reality television show The Block, hosted by Haim Etgar. The show premiered on May 30, 2009, on Channel 10.

In the show, five couples are required to overhaul a totally wrecked apartment. They only have 200,000 NIS to use towards designing their apartment.

Contestants

References

External links

Channel 10 (Israeli TV channel)
Channel 10 (Israeli TV channel) original programming
Home renovation television series
Israeli reality television series
2000s Israeli television series
2009 Israeli television series debuts
2009 Israeli television series endings
Non-Australian television series based on Australian television series